Ohannés Gurekian (August 24, 1902 in Constantinople – March 1, 1984 in Asolo) was an Armenian architect, engineer, and alpinist.

Biography

Early life and education
Ohannés Gurekian, son of Léon Gurekian and Mariamik Azarian, was born August 24, 1902 in Constantinople. He emigrated with his parents to Italy in 1907, living briefly in Rome and then in Asolo. He studied at the Armenian College Moorat Raphaël in Venice.

At his father's direction, Ohannés enrolled in the school of engineering at the University of Padova, where he received a degree in Civil Engineering in 1924, and completed a specialization in Hydraulic Engineering in 1926 (though he never worked as a hydraulic engineer). Immediately after completing his specialization, he was apprenticed to the Architect Ballatore di Rosanna at his firm in Turin.

The Dolomites 
After a brief period of collaboration with the engineer Bolzon, of Asolo, Ohannés moved to Frassené Agordino, which he had gotten to know as a regular vacation spot since 1922. Attracted by the mystique of the Dolomites, he established himself there as a civil engineer.

As a student, Ohannés had belonged to the Treviso chapter of the Italian Alpine Club and, having moved to Frassené, he joined the Agordo chapter. There he met the "Axis of Alpinism" Attilio Tissi, Giovanni and Alvise Andrich, and Domenico Rudatis. On the 25th of August 1929, he became the first to climb the "Torre Armena" peak of the Agner Mountain group.

In 1932 he was appointed Special Commissioner of Agordo's chapter of the Italian Alpine Club and, from 1933 to 1946, he was its president.
In 1935 he collaborated with Ettore Castiglioni to draft the section of a guidebook for the Italian Alps relating to the southern chain of the Pale di San Martino.

He is considered a pioneer of modern alpinism of the Eastern Alps, and the refuge at Malga Losch, at the feet of the massif of Mount Agner (which he considered "his mountains") was dedicated to him posthumously.
He dedicated himself to the promotion of tourism for Frassené, where he founded the first Italian "Pro Loco" association and in 1933 he became a member of the Provincial Tourism Council of (Belluno).
From 1934 to 1946, in addition to his professional activities, he taught at the Mining Institute of Agordo.

In 1936 he Married Dina Della Lucia Dies (of Frassené). They had three children: Armen, Mannig, and Haïg.

Professional life 
At the start of the Second World War Ohannés moved definitively to Asolo despite continuing, for the rest of his life, to retain professional ties in the Agordino valleys.

At the end of the war he was called to take part in the Committee for the Reconstruction of the Province of Belluno. He identified the traditional architectural styles which should be adopted for each area in need of reconstruction. He also designed the Reconstruction Plan for the town of Caviola, which had been burned down in retaliation by Nazi troops in (20–21 August 1944).

In 1948, driven by the necessity of updating his skills after the unproductive wartime, he enrolled in the School of Architecture and Urbanism of the Institut Polytechnique at the University of Losanna - Rector of architecture Jean André Tschumi. Despite Having completed his coursework there, his own work did not leave him with enough time to matriculate.
His Professional work was fundamentally directed towards Urbanism, to public buildings, and to Industrial structures.

From 1964 on, his sons (first Armen and then Haig) collaborated with him in his Architectural Practice. He died in Asolo on 1 March 1984.

Works and Significant Projects

1930 -1939 
 1932 Agordo - Expansion and renovation of the Civic Hospital
 1934 Frassené - Villa Parolari
 1937 Monte Piana - Touristic/Historical Development Plan for Battlefields
 1938 Agordo - Expansion and renovation of the Mining Institute
 1939 Pieve di Livinallongo - regulatory plan of Arabba

1940 - 1949 
 1940 La Stanga - Employee's Village for the Hydroelectric Power Station
 1941 Caoria - Hydroelectric Power Station (Completed in 1947) and residence for employees
 1943 Saviner - Hydroelectric Power Station (first part)
 1945 Caviola - Reconstruction Plan
 1946 Pian Cansiglio - Reconstruction of five Barracks burned by Nazi troops (1944)
 1949 Marghera - Reconstruction of three buildings for employees of the S.A.V.A. - Veneto Aluminum Society

1950 - 1959 
 1950 Passo Duran - Refuge "Cesare Tomé" of the Italian Alpine Club
 1950 Saviner - Hydroelectric Power Station - Second phase expansion and central habitation
 1950 Voltago - Preschool
 1951 Agordo - warden's house for the dam at S. Cipriano
 1951 Agordo - Topological and Volumetric plan for the Edifici Masoch
 1952 Falcade - Manufacturing program
 1952 Falcade - City Hall
 1952 Cime d’Auta - Refuge "Alvise Andrich"- Italian Alpine Club Alpino (First project not completed)
 1953 Alleghe - Villa De Lorenzi
 1953 Arsié - Hydroelectric Power Station and habitation for command center and shift workers
 1953 Forte Buso - Command Center for the dam on the Travignolo
 1954 Marghera - Two habitational compounds for the employees of S.A.V.A. - Veneto Aluminum Society
 1956 Frassené - Church and Belltower
 1957 Quero - Hydroelectric power station and Compound for Workshops and housing for command and shift workers.
 1957 Redipuglia - Transformer Substation and Compound for Workshops and housing for command and shift workers.
 1958 Zevio - Hydroelectric Power Station on the Adige, Control Center Barrier, Workshop and habitation for workers
 1959 Selva di Cadore - City Hall

1960 - 1969 
 1960 Colle S. Lucia - City Hall
 1961 Marghera - Expansion and renovation of the executive offices of the Veneto Aluminum Society
 1961 Val Schener - Command Center for water intake system
 1961 Frassené - Expansion of Rifugio Scarpa - Italian Alpine Club
 1961 Gron - Parish Church
 1962 Lappach (Selva dei Molini) - Hydroelectric power station
 1962 Val Schener - Hydroelectric power station in cavern, Access Gate, Command Center, and Warden's residence.
 1964 Longarone - Plan for Parish Church (First plan was not completed)
 1965 Falcade - General regulatory plan
 1965 Selva di Cadore - Plan for the allotment of S.Fosca
 1966 Livinallongo - General regulatory plan
 1966 Longarone - Plan for Parish Church (Second plan was not completed)
 1967 Selva di Cadore - Manufacturing program
 1967 Mschicca (Libano) - Educational Compound (Contest)
 1967 Frassené - Preschool
 1969 Forca Rossa - Refuge "Alvise Andrich"- Italian Alpine Club (second project not completed)
 1969 Voltago - Building Regulation

1970 - 1984 
 1970 Longarone - Social Center (not completed)
 1975 Teheran - residential complex Garni (project) (contest)

along with many educational structures and individual homes

References

Bibliography 
 Fondazione Architettura Belluno Dolomiti - Fulvio Bona, Tommaso Del Zenero, Sara Gnech, Ohannés Gurekian, L'ingegneria, L'architettura, L'Urbanistica, Istituto Bellunese di Ricerche Sociali e Culturali, ISBN 978-88-98941-27-8, Godega S.Urbano, 2021.

External links 

Ethnic Armenian architects
Architects from Veneto
Emigrants from the Ottoman Empire to Italy
Armenian engineers
20th-century Italian engineers
Armenians from the Ottoman Empire
Italian people of Armenian descent
1902 births
1984 deaths
Italian mountain climbers
20th-century Armenian architects
San Lazzaro degli Armeni alumni